The Dominion Observatory is a historic observatory in the Botanic Gardens in Wellington, New Zealand. It was the second observatory in Wellington. It was built in 1907 and originally named the Hector Observatory after James Hector until 1925. It was built to replace the Colonial Observatory which was located in the Bolton Street Cemetery.

The observatory was primarily used to maintain New Zealand Mean Time for the Time Service based on astronomical observations.

It was designed by architect John Campbell in the Edwardian Baroque style.

The observatory was vacant in 1993, and in 2003 it was refurbished by the Department of Conservation to be used by private businesses.

References

External links 
 Dominion Observatory – Department of Conservation

Buildings and structures in Wellington City
Heritage New Zealand Category 1 historic places in the Wellington Region
1900s architecture in New Zealand
Astronomical observatories in New Zealand
John Campbell (architect) buildings